The history of the Jews in Slovakia goes back to the 11th century, when the first Jews settled in the area.

Early history

In the 14th century, about 800 Jews lived in Bratislava, the majority of them engaged in commerce and money lending. In the early 15th century, a Jewish cemetery was established at Tisinec and was in use until 1892.

In 1494, a blood libel caused sixteen Jews to be burned at the stake in Trnava, and in 1526, after the Battle of Mohács, Jews were expelled from all major towns. In 1529, thirty Jews were burned at the stake in Pezinok.

In the late 17th century and early 18th century, Jews began to return to their original cities and establish organized communities, though they were barred from many trading industries and often in conflict with non-Jews. In 1683, hundreds of Jews from Moravia fled to the Hungarian Kingdom, seeking refuge from Kuruc riots and restrictions on their living imposed in Moravia. In 1700, a leading yeshiva was established in Bratislava and recognized by the government. Under Joseph II, Jews received many additional civil liberties.

19th century

Jewish communities emerged in the late eighteenth century following immigration from Bohemia, Moravia, Austria and Poland. The communities were affected by the schism in Hungarian Jewry in the mid-nineteenth century, eventually splitting into Orthodox (the majority), Status Quo, and more liberal Neolog factions. Following Jewish emancipation in 1896, many Jews had adopted Hungarian language and customs to advance in society. Many Jews moved to cities and joined the professions; others remained in the countryside, mostly working as artisans, merchants, and shopkeepers. Their multilingualism helped them advance in business, but put them in conflict with Slovak nationalism. The Slovak Jews were not as integrated as the Jews in Bohemia and Moravia, preferring a traditional lifestyle. Traditional religious antisemitism was joined by the stereotypical view of Jews as exploiters of poor Slovaks (economic antisemitism), and a form of "national anti-Semitism" that accused Jews of sympathizing with Hungarian and later Czechoslovak national aims.

Interwar period
After World War I, Slovakia became part of the new country of Czechoslovakia. In both parts of the new republic, anti-Jewish riots broke out in the aftermath of the declaration of independence (1918–1920), although the violence was not nearly as serious as in Ukraine or Poland. Blood libel accusations occurred in Trenčin and in Šalavský Gemer in the 1920s. In the 1930s, the Great Depression affected Jewish businessmen and also increased economic antisemitism. Economic underdevelopment and perceptions of discrimination in Czechoslovakia led a plurality (about one-third) of Slovaks to support the conservative, ethnonationalist Slovak People's Party (: HSĽS). HSĽS viewed minority groups such as Czechs, Hungarians, Jews, and Romani people as a destructive influence on the Slovak nation, and presented Slovak autonomy as the solution to Slovakia's problems. The party began to emphasize antisemitism during the late 1930s following a wave of Jewish refugees from Austria in 1938 and anti-Jewish laws passed by Hungary, Poland, and Romania.

In the 1930s, antisemitic rioting and demonstrations broke out, incited by the Slovak People's Party. During the rioting, professional Jewish boxers and wrestlers took to the streets to defend their neighborhoods from antisemitic gangs, and one of them, Imi Lichtenfeld, would later use his experiences to develop Krav Maga.

The Holocaust

 
Some 5,000 Jews emigrated before the outbreak of World War II and several thousands afterwards (mostly to the British Mandate of Palestine), but most were killed in the Holocaust. After the Slovak Republic proclaimed its independence in March 1939 under the protection of Nazi Germany, the pro-Nazi regime of President Jozef Tiso, a Catholic priest, began a series of measures aimed against the Jews in the country, first excluding them from the military and government positions. The Hlinka Guard began to attack Jews, and the "Jewish Code" was passed in September 1941. Resembling the Nuremberg Laws, the Code required that Jews wear a yellow armband and were banned from intermarriage and many jobs. By 1940, more than 6,000 Jews had emigrated. By October 1941, 15,000 Jews were expelled from Bratislava; many were sent to labor camps, including Sereď. 

Originally, the Slovak government tried to make a deal with Germany in October 1941 to deport its Jews as a substitute for providing Slovak workers to help the war effort. The initial terms were for 20,000 young men aged 16 and older for forced labour, but the Slovak government was concerned that it would leave many aged, sick, or child Jews who would become a burden on the gentile population. A deal was reached where the Slovak Republic would pay 500 Reichsmark for each Jew deported, and in return, the Germans would deport entire families and promise that the Jews would never return. This was billed as a humanitarian measure that would keep Jewish families together; the Slovak fascist authorities claimed that they did not know that the Germans were systematically exterminating the Jews under its control. Some Jews were exempt from deportation, including those who had converted before 1939.

The deportations of Jews from Slovakia started on March 25, 1942. Transports were halted on October 20, 1942. A group of Jewish activists known as the Working Group tried to stop the process through a mix of bribery and negotiation. However, some 58,000 Jews had already been deported by October 1942, mostly to the Operation Reinhard death camps in the General Government in occupied Poland and to Auschwitz. More than 99% of the Jews deported from Slovakia in 1942 were murdered in the concentration death camps.

Jewish deportations resumed on September 30, 1944, after German troops occupied the Slovak territory to defeat the Slovak National uprising. During the German occupation, up to 13,500 Slovak Jews were deported (mostly to Auschwitz where most of them were gassed upon arrival), principally through the Jewish transit camp in Sereď under the command of Alois Brunner, and about 2,000 were murdered in the Slovak territory by members of the Einsatzgruppe H and the Hlinka Guard Emergency Divisions. Deportations continued until March 31, 1945, when the last group of Jewish prisoners was taken from Sereď to the Terezín ghetto. In all, German and Slovak authorities deported about 71,500 Jews from Slovakia; about 65,000 of them were murdered or died in concentration camps. The overall figures are inexact, partly because many Jews did not identify themselves, but one 2006 estimate is that approximately 105,000 Slovak Jews, or 77% of their prewar population, died during the war.

After World War II

 
11 Jews were murdered by an unidentified UPA group in September 1945 in Kolbasov.

In the Topoľčany pogrom 48 Jews were seriously injured. 13 anti-Jewish incidents called partisan pogroms took place between August 1 and 5, 1946, the biggest one in Žilina, where 15 people were wounded. Antisemitic manifestations took place in Bratislava in August 1946 and in August 1948.

In 1946, the Slovak writer Karel František Koch argued that the antisemitic incidents that he witnessed in Bratislava after the war were "not antisemitism, but something far worse—the robber’s anxiety that he might have to return Jewish property [stolen in the Holocaust]," a view that has been endorsed by Czech-Slovak scholar .

After the war, the number of Jews in Slovakia was estimated to be 25,000. Most of them decided to emigrate. In February 1948, Communist rule was established after the 1948 Czechoslovak coup d'état. It lasted until November 1989 Velvet Revolution. During those years, little or no Jewish life existed. Many Jews emigrated to Israel or the United States to regain their freedom of religion. After 1989, and with the peaceful breakup of Czechoslovakia and Slovak independence in 1993, there was some resurgence in Jewish life. However, most Jews were elderly, and younger ones largely assimilated through intermarriage.

According to the 2021 census of Slovakia, the Jewish community had 2,007 members, which is about 0.04% of the total population of Slovakia. About 839 of them live in Bratislava Region (0.12% of the total population), followed by 311 members in Košice and 210 members in Trnava Region (both: 0.04%). The Jewish population increased by 8 members since the 2011 census.

Slovak Jews

See also
History of the Jews in Bratislava
Oberlander Jews
History of the Jews in Carpathian Ruthenia
History of the Jews in the Czech Republic
 Stolpersteine in the Banská Bystrica Region
 Stolpersteine in the Trnava Region
 Judeo-Czech language

Notes

References

Further reading

External links
 The Story of the Jewish Community in Bratislava An online exhibition by Yad Vashem
 History of the Jews in Slovakia
 Concise Jewish History of Slovakia
 Jewish heritage of Slovakia
 Jewish Community Museum in Bratislava
 Chatam Sofer Memorial in Bratislava
 Nazi Camp Engerau in Bratislava-Petržalka